Greater Grace World Outreach (GGWO) is a nondenominational evangelical Christian churches that emphasize grace, the finished work, and missions. The headquarters of Greater Grace World Outreach is currently located at its megachurch (locally named Greater Grace Church Baltimore) in Baltimore, Maryland. The church has a weekly attendance of 1500+. GGWO was founded by Carl H. Stevens Jr. who was succeeded by Pastor Thomas Schaller as Presiding Elder and Overseeing Pastor of Greater Grace World Outreach in Baltimore in April 2005. GGWO has been investigated by multiple organizations for cult-like practices including spiritual abuse by leadership.  

The church is thriving and has over 500 churches throughout the world. Most of these churches are located in North America, Europe and Africa, with larger congregations in Hungary, Azerbaijan and Ghana. Most of the pastors attended affiliated Maryland Bible College & Seminary in Baltimore, however there are many other affiliated Bible colleges around the world. The ministries of Greater Grace also include the radio program Grace Hour, Greater Grace Christian Academy, Christian Sports Clubs, along with other internal ministries.

Beliefs and practices

The beliefs of Greater Grace are outlined in its doctrinal statement and detailed in booklets written by Carl H. Stevens. Worship is non-liturgical but is generally structured as follows: (singing) announcements, worship (singing), offering, opening prayer, sermon, closing prayer/benediction/alter call,(singing) closing announcements. Songs are usually contemporary, but classical hymns are also sung on account of the wide range of ages among members. An "offering song" is also sung during the taking of the offering, which is often sung by a member of the congregation who is not a regular member of the worship team, or by one of the churches choirs. Evangelism, raps (devotionals, or informal Q&A meetings, usually following sermons, but also held at various times throughout the week, most notably during lunch hour), and informal Bible study are also considered important acts of worship.

The organization has a 10-point Doctrinal Statement available on its website.  The organization limits the pastorate and/or homiletic role to men due to a literal interpretation of I Tim. 2:12, but allows women to lead in just about any other capacity. The church leadership is strongly anti-homosexual and anti-abortion.

History

Origins
In the early 1960s, Carl H. Stevens Jr., a bakery truck driver, was praying at Wortheley Pond near Peru, Maine, and developed a vision for a worldwide Christian ministry. Stevens was later ordained by a council of independent ministers at the Montsweag Baptist Church on March 7, 1963. From there Stevens went on to minister at the Woolwich-Wiscasset Baptist Church, and establish the Northeast School of the Bible in 1972. He also began to experiment with radio evangelism, with a program called "Telephone Time."

In 1973, following an arson attack on their church building and a controversial church split, Stevens and his closest followers moved the center of their operations to a former Catholic school facility in South Berwick, Maine. There "The Bible Speaks" became the name of the church, and "the Northeast School of the Bible" was renamed as "Stevens School of the Bible". Expanded radio and television outreaches continued to draw in new followers and—both through church planting operations by the organization's Bible school students and graduates, and existing churches affiliating themselves with Stevens' organization—a network of "branch ministries" began to develop.

In 1976, the school grew beyond its capacity. As a result, Carl Stevens moved the "home base" of his organization to a former private boarding school facility which they were able to purchase in Lenox, Massachusetts.

Former organization

The cornerstone of Stevens' career in Christian broadcasting was the call-in radio show he hosted, originally known as "Telephone Time", now called "Grace Hour". In 2006, this program won an Angel award for Excellence in Media.

In both South Berwick and Lenox, the Bible Speaks developed a considerable local presence, not only through drawing large numbers of young adults into these small communities as Bible school students, but also through operating extensive Sunday School operations, with a private fleet of retired school buses for bringing in children from the surrounding area.

They also established a network of private K-12 schools, beginning with Southern Maine Christian Schools in South Berwick (later moved to Scarborough, Maine), and then Stevens Christian Schools in Lenox. Church planting missionary teams were also sent out first to El Salvador and then to Finland and other European countries . In the 1980s this expanded to include church planting operations in South America, Africa, Asia and Australia. Thomas Schaller, the current leader of GGWO, began his pastoral career as the head of their original missionary team to Finland.

In the 1983, the Bible Speaks purchased a Norwegian ferry boat which they renovated to use as a missionary relief vessel in the Caribbean. This boat was named La Gracia, with Baltimore, Maryland as its official home port.

Present organization
In Baltimore, Greater Grace World Outreach quickly grew and established ministries including the Grace Hour, Greater Grace Christian Academy, Maryland Bible College and Seminary, the Christian Athletics Program, as well as international outreach ministries.  

In 2003, Carl Stevens became too ill to continue his leadership of GGWO. In 2005, the elders elected Rodger Stenger to become the new chief elder of the church. However, Rodger Stenger chose not to accept the position. In his place the elders elected Thomas Schaller as senior pastor, after a congregational vote. Still, many of the elders and senior pastors were dissatisfied with the choice, citing Schaller's views on the role of the senior pastor. In 2004, many church leaders, associated ministry leaders, and affiliate churches elected to disaffiliate.  A group of pastors who disaffiliated formed a new organization known as The International Association of Grace Ministries. The church is thriving and have over 600 churches throughout the world.

Organization
GGWO is an affiliation of international churches, whose pastors are ordained by the leadership of Greater Grace Church Baltimore (GGWO headquarters), who agree to abide by the standards of the church. In return, the affiliation allows pastors to have fellowship and communion with other pastors and churches, mostly within the worldwide Greater Grace community of churches, but occasionally outside of it as well. Technically, it is an affiliation of pastors who agree to worship under the GGWO "umbrella", and not the congregations themselves, as GGWO recognizes local congregations as fully autonomous and independent. However, if a congregation's pastor is an ordained member of GGWO then that congregation is considered to be a member of the greater GGWO body of churches as well. Be that as it may, GGWO does not interfere with an individual church's affairs unless assistance is requested.

Critics

On several occasions, Greater Grace World Outreach has been accused of cult-like behavior. A letter was written by the Christian Research Institute, which offers a list of suggestions for the church, attempting to correct any of the false teachings that might exist. The main teaching which was considered a concern was that of delegated authority. However, in this document, Miller concedes that "TBS has, up to the time of this writing, also maintained an orthodox, biblical position on those doctrines most essential to the Christian faith. Thus, we do not consider TBS a non-Christian cult, but rather a Christian ministry." The document concludes with a call to repentance for the egregious sins committed by Stevens and leadership of GGWO. A repentance that has not come in full.

References

External links
 Greater Grace World Outreach Website
 GGWO U.S.A Churches.org Website
 GGWO Missions Website
 DiscussGGWO 
 CarlStevens.org
 Fisher, Marc (1986-09-04). "Money Talks, Bible Speaks -- How To Spend $7 Million Religiously?" Times Union (Albany, NY). Retrieved 2012-05-15. 
 60 Minutes, (1987-05-31) Part 1, Reporting by Correspondent Roger Mudd. CBS. Season 20. 15 minutes. Retrieved from YouTube 2012-05-15.
 60 Minutes, (1987-05-31) Part 2, Interviews with Diane Sawyer. CBS. Season 20. 11 minutes. Retrieved from YouTube 2012-05-15.
 In re THE BIBLE SPEAKS, Debtor. Elizabeth DOVYDENAS, Plaintiff, Appellee, v. THE BIBLE SPEAKS, Defendant, Appellant. 869 F.2d 628. United States Court of Appeals, First Circuit. Heard Oct. 4, 1988. Decided March 9, 1989. Retrieved 2012-05-15. 
 Bondy, Flip (2001-04-17). "Church of team pastor has troubled roots" New York Daily News. Retrieved 2012-05-15.
 Gleick, Elizabeth and Lambert, Pam (2003-04-19). "The Strangers Among Us-It's Not Just Waco: Cults Ruled by Paranoia Flourish All Over America" People Magazine. Retrieved 2012-05-15.

Religious scandals
Evangelical megachurches in the United States
Evangelical churches in Maryland
Churches in Baltimore
Christian missions
Christian organizations established in 1987
1987 establishments in Maryland